Anthropocentrism is the belief that human beings are the central or most important entity in the universe. The term can be used interchangeably with humanocentrism, and some refer to the concept as human supremacy or human exceptionalism. From an anthropocentric perspective, humankind is seen as separate from nature and superior to it, and other entities (animals, plants, minerals, etc.) are viewed as resources for humans to use.

Anthropocentrism interprets or regards the world in terms of human values and experiences. It is considered to be profoundly embedded in many modern human cultures and conscious acts. It is a major concept in the field of environmental ethics and environmental philosophy, where it is often considered to be the root cause of problems created by human action within the ecosphere.
However, many proponents of anthropocentrism state that this is not necessarily the case: they argue that a sound long-term view acknowledges that the global environment must be made continually suitable for humans and that the real issue is shallow anthropocentrism.

Environmental philosophy
Anthropocentrism, also known as homocentricism or human supremacism, has been posited by some environmentalists, in such books as Confessions of an Eco-Warrior by Dave Foreman and Green Rage by Christopher Manes, as the underlying (if unstated) reason why humanity dominates and sees the need to "develop" most of the Earth. Anthropocentrism is believed by some to be the central problematic concept in environmental philosophy, where it is used to draw attention to claims of a systematic bias in traditional Western attitudes to the non-human world that shapes humans' sense of self and identities. Val Plumwood argued that anthropocentrism plays an analogous role in green theory to androcentrism in feminist theory and ethnocentrism in anti-racist theory. Plumwood called human-centredness "anthrocentrism" to emphasise this parallel.

One of the first extended philosophical essays addressing environmental ethics, John Passmore's Man's Responsibility for Nature has been criticised by defenders of deep ecology because of its anthropocentrism, often claimed to be constitutive of traditional Western moral thought. Indeed, defenders of anthropocentrism concerned with the ecological crisis contend that the maintenance of a healthy, sustainable environment is necessary for human well-being as opposed to for its own sake. According to William Grey, the problem with a "shallow" viewpoint is not that it is human-centred: "What's wrong with shallow views is not their concern about the well-being of humans, but that they do not really consider enough in what that well-being consists. According to this view, we need to develop an enriched, fortified anthropocentric notion of human interest to replace the dominant short-term, sectional and self-regarding conception." In turn, Plumwood in Environmental Culture: The Ecological Crisis of Reason argued that Grey's anthropocentrism is inadequate.

Many devoted environmentalists encompass a somewhat anthropocentric-based philosophical view supporting the fact that they will argue in favor of saving the environment for the sake of human populations. Grey writes: "We should be concerned to promote a rich, diverse, and vibrant biosphere. Human flourishing may certainly be included as a legitimate part of such a flourishing." Such a concern for human flourishing amidst the flourishing of life as a whole, however, is said to be indistinguishable from that of deep ecology and biocentrism, which has been proposed as both an antithesis of anthropocentrism and as a generalised form of anthropocentrism.

Christian traditions
In the 1985 CBC series "A Planet For the Taking", Dr. David Suzuki explored the Old Testament roots of anthropocentrism and how it shaped human views of non-human animals. Some Christian proponents of anthropocentrism base their belief on the Bible, such as the verse 1:26 in the Book of Genesis:

The use of the word "dominion" in the Genesis has been used to justify an anthropocentric worldview, but recently some have found it controversial, viewing it as possibly a mistranslation from the Hebrew. However an argument can be made that the Bible actually places all the importance on God as creator, and humans as merely another part of creation.

Human rights
Anthropocentrism is the grounding for some naturalistic concepts of human rights. Defenders of anthropocentrism argue that it is the necessary fundamental premise to defend universal human rights, since what matters morally is simply being human. For example, noted philosopher Mortimer J. Adler wrote, "Those who oppose injurious discrimination on the moral ground that all human beings, being equal in their humanity, should be treated equally in all those respects that concern their common humanity, would have no solid basis in fact to support their normative principle." Adler is stating here that denying what is now called human exceptionalism could lead to tyranny, writing that if humans ever came to believe that they do not possess a unique moral status, the intellectual foundation of their liberties collapses: "Why, then, should not groups of superior men be able to justify their enslavement, exploitation, or even genocide of inferior human groups on factual and moral grounds akin to those we now rely on to justify our treatment of the animals we harness as beasts of burden, that we butcher for food and clothing, or that we destroy as disease-bearing pests or as dangerous predators?".

Author and anthropocentrism defender Wesley J. Smith from the Discovery Institute has written that human exceptionalism is what gives rise to human duties to each other, the natural world, and to treat animals humanely. Writing in A Rat is a Pig is a Dog is a Boy, a critique of animal rights ideology, "Because we are unquestionably a unique species—the only species capable of even contemplating ethical issues and assuming responsibilities—we uniquely are capable of apprehending the difference between right and wrong, good and evil, proper and improper conduct toward animals. Or to put it more succinctly, if being human isn't what requires us to treat animals humanely, what in the world does?".

Animal rights 

Anthropocentrism has been criticised by animal rights and welfare advocates, who contend that the belief that humans are more important than other animals is false and that like humans, non-human animals have intrinsic value. One of the earliest of these critics was the zoologist and philosopher J. Howard Moore, who in The Universal Kinship (1906) argued that Charles Darwin's On the Origin of Species (1859) "sealed the doom of anthropocentricism" and that:Philosophers such as Peter Singer and David Pearce have argued against anthropocentric ethics, instead advocating for antispeciesist or sentientist ethics, which rather than giving more value to humans based on their species membership, assert that "other things being equal, equally strong interests should count equally." This utilitarian principle is based on the dictum "everybody to count for one, nobody for more than one" attributed to Jeremy Bentham by John Stuart Mill in Utilitarianism (1876).

Cognitive psychology
In cognitive psychology, the term anthropocentric thinking has been defined as "the tendency to reason about unfamiliar biological species or processes by analogy to humans." Reasoning by analogy is an attractive thinking strategy, and it can be tempting to apply one's own experience of being human to other biological systems. For example, because death is commonly felt to be undesirable, it may be tempting to form the misconception that death at a cellular level or elsewhere in nature is similarly undesirable (whereas in reality programmed cell death is an essential physiological phenomenon, and ecosystems also rely on death). Conversely, anthropocentric thinking can also lead people to underattribute human characteristics to other organisms. For instance, it may be tempting to wrongly assume that an animal that is very different from humans, such as an insect, will not share particular biological characteristics, such as reproduction or blood circulation.

Anthropocentric thinking has predominantly been studied in young children (mostly up to the age of 10) by developmental psychologists interested in its relevance to biology education. Children as young as 6 have been found to attribute human characteristics to species unfamiliar to them (in Japan), such as rabbits, grasshoppers or tulips. Although relatively little is known about its persistence at a later age, evidence exists that this pattern of human exceptionalist thinking can continue through young adulthood at least, even among students who have been increasingly educated in biology.

The notion that anthropocentric thinking is an innate human characteristic has been challenged by study of American children raised in urban environments, among whom it appears to emerge between the ages of 3 and 5 years as an acquired perspective. Children's recourse to anthropocentric thinking seems to vary with their experience of nature, and cultural assumptions about the place of humans in the natural world. For example, whereas young children who kept goldfish were found to think of frogs as being more goldfish-like, other children tended to think of frogs in terms of humans. More generally, children raised in rural environments appear to use anthropocentric thinking less than their urban counterparts because of their greater familiarity with different species of animals and plants. Studies involving children from some of the indigenous peoples of the Americas have found little use of anthropocentric thinking. Study of children among the Wichí people in South America showed a tendency to think of living organisms in terms of their perceived taxonomic similarities, ecological considerations, and animistic traditions, resulting in a much less anthropocentric view of the natural world than is experienced by many children in Western societies.

In popular culture

In fiction from all eras and societies, there is fiction treating as normal the actions of humans to ride, eat, milk, and otherwise treat animals as separate species. There are occasional exceptions, such as talking animals, but they are generally treated as exceptions, as aberrations to the rule distinguishing people from animals.

In science fiction, humanocentrism is the idea that humans, as both beings and as a species, are the superior sentients. Essentially the equivalent of racial supremacy on a galactic scale, it entails intolerant discrimination against sentient non-humans, much like race supremacists discriminate against those not of their race. A prime example of this concept is utilized as a story element for the Mass Effect series. After humanity's first contact results in a brief war, many humans in the series develop suspicious or even hostile attitudes towards the game's various alien races. By the time of the first game, which takes place several decades after the war, many humans still retain such sentiments in addition to forming 'pro-human' organizations.

This idea is countered by anti-humanism. At times, this ideal also includes fear of and superiority over strong AIs and cyborgs, downplaying the ideas of integration, cybernetic revolts, machine rule and Tilden's Laws of Robotics.

Mark Twain mocked the belief in human supremacy in Letters from the Earth (written c. 1909, published 1962).

The Planet of the Apes franchise focuses on the analogy of apes becoming the dominant species in society and the fall of humans (see also human extinction). In the 1968 film, Taylor, a human states "take your stinking paws off me, you damn dirty ape!". In the 2001 film, this is contrasted with Attar (a gorilla)'s quote "take your stinking hands off me, you damn dirty human!". This links in with allusions that in becoming the dominant species apes are becoming more like humans (anthropomorphism). In the film Battle for the Planet of the Apes, Virgil, an orangutan states "ape has never killed ape, let alone an ape child. Aldo has killed an ape child. The branch did not break. It was cut with a sword." in reference to planned murder; a stereotypical human concept. Additionally, in Dawn of the Planet of the Apes, Caesar states "I always think...ape better than human. I see now...how much like them we are".

In George Orwell's novel Animal Farm, this theme of anthropocentrism is also present. Whereas originally the animals planned for liberation from humans and animal equality, as evident from the "seven commandments" such as "whatever goes upon two legs is an enemy.", "Whatever goes upon four legs, or has wings, is a friend", "All animals are equal."; the pigs would later abridge the commandments with statements such as "All animals are equal, but some animals are more equal than others." and "Four legs good, two legs better."

The 2012 documentary The Superior Human? systematically analyzes anthropocentrism and concludes that value is fundamentally an opinion, and since life forms naturally value their own traits, most humans are misled to believe that they are actually more valuable than other species. This natural bias, according to the film, combined with a received sense of comfort and an excuse for exploitation of non-humans cause anthropocentrism to remain in society.

See also

References

Further reading
 Bertalanffy, Ludwig Von (1993) General System Theory: Foundations, Development, Applications pp. 239–48
 Boddice, Rob (ed.) (2011) Anthropocentrism: Humans, Animals, Environments Leiden and Boston: Brill

 
 

 White, Lynn Townsend, Jr, "The Historical Roots of Our Ecologic Crisis", Science, Vol 155 (Number 3767), 10 March 1967, pp 1203–1207
Human supremacism: why are animal rights activists still the "orphans of the left"?. New Statesman America. April 30, 2019.
Human Supremacy: The Source of All Environmental Crises? Psychology Today December 25, 2021

Animal ethics
Environmental ethics
Humanism
Philosophical theories